Kenneth Lonergan (born October 16, 1962) is an American film director, playwright, and screenwriter. He is the co-writer of the film Gangs of New York (2002), and wrote and directed You Can Count on Me (2000), Margaret (2011), and Manchester by the Sea (2016). Lonergan is also known for his work as a playwright. His most noted plays include This Is Our Youth, Lobby Hero and The Waverly Gallery. Each also had a successful revival engagement on Broadway, which resulted in each play receiving a nomination for the Tony Award for Best Revival of a Play.

Lonergan won the Academy Award for Best Original Screenplay for Manchester by the Sea, for which he was also nominated for Best Director; he also earned Academy Award nominations for his screenplays for You Can Count on Me and Gangs of New York. He also won the BAFTA Award for Best Original Screenplay for Manchester by the Sea at the 70th British Academy Film Awards.

Early life and education
Lonergan was born in The Bronx, New York City to a psychiatrist mother and physician father. His mother is Jewish, and his father was of Irish descent.

Lonergan began writing in high school at the Walden School, a now defunct, highly progressive private school in Manhattan with a strong drama program.

His first play, The Rennings Children, was chosen for the Stephen Sondheim-founded Young Playwrights, Inc. Young Playwright's Festival in 1982 while he was still an undergraduate. Lonergan matriculated to Wesleyan University, where he trained as a playwright and director. He graduated from the NYU Playwriting Program. He is an alumnus of HB Studio in New York City.

Government and commercial work

After graduating from NYU, Lonergan worked as a speechwriter for the Environmental Protection Agency. He also wrote industrial shows (long-play commercials) for clients such as Weight Watchers.

Career

Stage
Lonergan's first theatrical success came with the play This Is Our Youth (1996); it was followed by The Waverly Gallery (1999), based on his grandmother's Greenwich Village gallery, and later Lobby Hero (2002). His play The Starry Messenger premiered Off-Broadway in 2009 and starred his wife J. Smith-Cameron and Matthew Broderick.

In August 2014, This Is Our Youth was revived on Broadway starring Michael Cera, Kieran Culkin, and Tavi Gevinson at the Cort Theatre. The play received a nomination for the Tony Award for Best Revival of a Play.

In March 2018, Lobby Hero was revived on Broadway starring Chris Evans, Michael Cera, Brian Tyree Henry, and Bel Powley at the Helen Hayes Theatre. The play received a nomination for the Tony Award for Best Revival of a Play. Cera and Tyree Henry were also nominated for their performances.

In September 2018, The Waverly Gallery was revived on Broadway starring Elaine May, Lucas Hedges, Joan Allen, David Cromer, and Michael Cera at the John Golden Theatre. The show received a nomination for the Tony Award for Best Revival of a Play. Elaine May won the Tony Award for Best Actress in a Play.

Film
Lonergan's film career began with his screenplay for the gangland comedy Analyze This (1999). He was subsequently offered a job writing The Adventures of Rocky and Bullwinkle (2000).

Lonergan directed his own screenplay for You Can Count on Me (2000); the film, which was executive produced by Martin Scorsese, went on to receive and be nominated for numerous writing awards. He contributed to the screenplay for Gangs of New York (2002). In 2005, filming took place for his second film as writer/director, Margaret, starring Anna Paquin, Matt Damon, Matthew Broderick, and J. Smith-Cameron. The film spent over five years in post-production, with Lonergan, the producers and various editors unable to agree on its final cut, resulting in multiple legal disputes. It was finally released in 2011. Margaret ranked 31st in a 2016 BBC poll of the 21st century's greatest films.

Lonergan wrote and directed Manchester by the Sea, which was released in 2016 to critical acclaim. He also had a small part in the film, as a pedestrian. David Fear of Rolling Stone said the film proves that Lonergan is "practically peerless in portraying loss as a living, breathing thing without resorting to the vocabulary of griefporn."

Lonergan also wrote the BBC/Starz miniseries Howards End.

Reception
Justin Chang of Variety noted that Lonergan is "always a superb director of actresses," particularly in Manchester by the Sea where the director "gives the women in his ensemble their due."

Personal life
Lonergan is married to actress J. Smith-Cameron. They have one daughter, Nellie.

In January 2020, Lonergan was appointed Visiting Fellow and Artist in Residence at Kellogg College of the University of Oxford.

Lonergan's stepfather was Freudian psychoanalyst Michael S. Porder.

Credits

Stage

Film

Television
Writer

Awards and nominations

References

Further reading
  (Online version is titled "The Cinematic Traumas of Kenneth Lonergan").

External links
 
 

1962 births
20th-century American dramatists and playwrights
Independent Spirit Award winners
Living people
Tisch School of the Arts alumni
People from the Bronx
Wesleyan University alumni
Writers Guild of America Award winners
Film directors from New York City
American people of Irish descent
Jewish American writers
American speechwriters
American male screenwriters
American male dramatists and playwrights
Best Original Screenplay Academy Award winners
Best Original Screenplay BAFTA Award winners
American male non-fiction writers
Screenwriters from New York (state)
Walden School (New York City) alumni
Best Screenplay AACTA International Award winners
20th-century American male writers